The Mulgrave River, incorporating the East Mulgrave River and the West Mulgrave River, is a river system located in Far North Queensland, Australia.

Location and features

Sourced by runoff from the Bellenden Ker Range, the headwaters of the Mulgrave River rise as the east and west branches of the river below South Peak and west of  respectively. The two branches form their confluence within the Wooroonooran National Park and the Wet Tropics World Heritage Area. The Trinity Inlet was once the river mouth of the Mulgrave River. Volcanic activity that resulted in the rise of Green Hill in the Mulgrave Valley blocked the river from entering the sea near present-day Cairns. However, further research has shown river sediments above the basalt flows and it is now believed that other factors such as alluvial sediments may have altered the river's course and that perhaps it has alternated between the two mouths over time.

From source to mouth, incorporating the east and west branches of the river, the river descends  over a combined  course.

The river is crossed by the Bruce Highway south of Gordonvale via the Desmond Trannore Bridge.

Gold was discovered in the river in the 1870s, bringing considerable change to the Goldsborough Valley. Gravel is now extracted from the riverbed.

Freshwater stonefish and crocodiles are found in the river, so caution is advised if swimming in the river. The pest fish tilapia have been discovered in the river and have been the target of eradication efforts.

Together with the Russell River, the Mulgrave River has a quite well-recorded flood history with documented evidence of flooding beginning in the late 19th century.

Language 
Yidinji (also known as Yidinj, Yidiny, and Idindji) is an Australian Aboriginal language. Its traditional language region is within the local government areas of Cairns Region and Tablelands Region, in such localities as Cairns, Gordonvale, and the Mulgrave River, and the southern part of the Atherton Tableland including Atherton and Kairi.

See also

Kearneys Falls

References

Rivers of Far North Queensland
Bodies of water of the Coral Sea